Lysaghts is an intercity train station located in Spring Hill, Australia, on the South Coast railway line's Port Kembla branch. The station serves NSW TrainLink trains travelling south to Port Kembla and north to Wollongong and Sydney. The station is surrounded on both sides by the Lysaght factory at Spring Hill. Trains only stop on request. There is no way out of the station unless commuters work at the neighbouring steelworks.

The station was one of 23 on the metropolitan rail network to record an average of fewer than one passenger per day in 2014.

History
John Lysaght commenced operations in 1918, and began manufacturing galvanised steel at Spring Hill in 1936. As the Port Kembla branch line, which opened in 1916, cut through the Lysaght site, a station was established in 1938 to cater to the company's workforce. The station has minimal facilities beyond its original skillion-roofed waiting shed and a 1986 pedestrian footbridge.

Platforms and Services

References

External links

Lysaghts station details Transport for New South Wales

Buildings and structures in Wollongong
Railway stations in Australia opened in 1938
Regional railway stations in New South Wales
Short-platform railway stations in New South Wales, 6 cars